Manuel da Ressurreição Figueiredo da Silva, nicknamed Gi, (born 27/04/68 in Luanda), is a former Angolan basketball player and a current basketball coach. At club level, Gi has been leading a reorganization effort of basketball at Clube Ferroviário de Luanda. In 2013, he has been appointed head coach of Angola's under-16 national basketball team. Following up to the success, he was appointed head coach of the U18 squad, two years later.

2013
In July 2013, "Gi" led Angola's under-16 national basketball team to their first continental title, beating Egypt 75-66 in the final, thus securing a spot at the 2014 under-17 world basketball championship in Dubai.

2016
In July 2016, "Gi" led Angola's under-18 national basketball team to their fourth African title, beating Egypt 86-82 in the final, in overtime, and qualify the team to the 2017 under-19 world basketball championship in Egypt.

External links 
 Profile at FIBA.com
 Jornal dos Desportos Interview pt

References 

1968 births
Living people
Angolan basketball coaches